Bhiwanadi West Assembly constituency  is one of the 288 Vidhan Sabha (legislative assembly) constituencies of Maharashtra state, western India. This constituency is located in Thane district.

Geographical scope
The constituency comprises parts of Bhiwandi taluka that is  parts of Bhiwandi-Nizampur Municipal Corporation namely Ward No 1 to 5, 18 to 35, 51 to 61, Khoni (CT), Shelar (CT), Katai (CT), Karivali (CT).

List of Members of Legislative Assembly

ELection Result

Assembly Elections 2004

Assembly Elections 2014

Assembly Election 2019

References

Assembly constituencies of Maharashtra
Assembly constituencies of Thane district
Bhiwandi
Politics of Thane district